Rosate is a comune (municipality) in the Metropolitan City of Milan in the Italian region Lombardy, located about  southwest of Milan.

Rosate borders the following municipalities: Gaggiano, Gudo Visconti, Besate, Noviglio, Morimondo, Vernate, Bubbiano, Calvignasco.

Notable people 
 Albericus de Rosate (c. 1290–1354 or 1360), jurist

Twin towns
Rosate is twinned with:

  Gmina Tarnowo Podgórne, Poland 
  Rohrdorf, Bavaria, Germany

References

External links
 Official website

Cities and towns in Lombardy